Harold Gabbitas (1 April 1905 – 1954) was an English professional footballer who played in the Football League for Mansfield Town.

In the 1939 Register of Mansfield he is described as a Colliery Hewer. He died at Mansfield Colliery on 8 December 1954, aged 49.

References

1905 births
1954 deaths
English footballers
Association football forwards
English Football League players
Worksop Town F.C. players
Mansfield Town F.C. players